Norris Ethan White (born January 1, 1991) is a former American soccer player who plays as a defender. He last played for New York City FC in Major League Soccer (MLS).

Early career
In high school, White was a four-year starter for the Bethesda-Chevy Chase Barons in the Montgomery County 3A Division, leading the team to the 2007 Maryland 3A State Championship defeating Bel Air High School 1–0.
In 2009, White was one of 3 players to start all 23 matches for Maryland and was named to the All-ACC Freshman team.  In 2010, he was named to the All-ACC Second Team.

Club career

D.C United 

White signed a homegrown player contract with D.C. United on December 14, 2010. He made his professional debut on April 6, 2011 in a Lamar Hunt U.S. Open Cup game against Philadelphia Union, and made his MLS debut on April 9 in a game against Los Angeles Galaxy.

White played in 24 games for D.C. United in 2011 logging 1928 minutes as a rookie.

White sent on a short loan with USL Pro club Richmond Kickers on June 14, 2012.

In 2013, White featured in 14 games for D.C. United logging 1099 minutes. White started in the Lamar Hunt U.S. Open Cup final that D.C. United won.

Philadelphia Union 

On January 14, 2014, White was traded with the #1 spot in the MLS Allocation Ranking to Philadelphia Union in exchange for Jeff Parke and the #6 Allocation Ranking.

In May 2014 White was loaned to USL team Harrisburg City Islanders. He made one appearance on May 2, against Charleston Battery receiving a red card in the 66th minute.

White made his debut with Philadelphia on July 12, 2014, in a 3-3 draw against the Colorado Rapids.

New York City FC 

On December 10, 2015 White was traded to New York City FC in exchange for a fourth-round selection in the 2017 MLS SuperDraft. He made his debut in the season opening, 4-3 win over Chicago on March 6, 2016. White was released by NYCFC on November 27, 2017. White is reportedly pursuing photography rather than soccer.

International
White was part of the U-20 United States Youth National Team player pool.  He played on the 2010 Milk Cup team that won in Northern Ireland.  He was also a member of the U-18 United States Youth National Team player pool.

Career statistics

Honors

Individual

2009 NCAA freshman of the year

Club

D.C. United
Lamar Hunt U.S. Open Cup (1): 2013

References

External links
 

1991 births
Living people
American soccer players
Maryland Terrapins men's soccer players
Homegrown Players (MLS)
D.C. United players
Richmond Kickers players
Philadelphia Union players
New York City FC players
Penn FC players
Soccer players from Maryland
Major League Soccer players
USL Championship players
United States men's under-20 international soccer players
Bethesda-Chevy Chase High School alumni
Association football defenders